The Peninsula Oilers are a college summer baseball club in the Alaska Baseball League. The Oilers are based in Kenai, Alaska, and their name refers to the Kenai Peninsula region.  They are the league's southernmost team. The team was founded in 1974 and play their home games in the 1,300-seat Coral Seymour Memorial Ballpark.

The Oilers won the National Baseball Congress tournament in 1977, 1993, and 1994. They finished second in 1991, 1999, and 2011.

Several successful Major League Baseball players have played for the Oilers, including 7-time All-Star Dave Stieb, Atlee Hammaker, 4-time All-Star Jimmy Key, John Olerud, Cy Young Award winner Frank Viola and six-time Rawlings Gold Glove Award winner J.T. Snow, and several first-round picks including J. D. Drew.

References

External links
 

1974 establishments in Alaska
Kenai Peninsula Borough, Alaska
Alaska Baseball League
Amateur baseball teams in Alaska
Baseball teams established in 1974
Baseball teams in Alaska